SHeDAISY was an American country music vocal group from Magna, Utah. The group consisted of sisters Kristyn Robyn Osborn (born August 24, 1970), Kelsi Marie Osborn (born November 21, 1974), and Kassidy Lorraine Osborn (born October 30, 1976). The group's name is derived from the word shideezhí, a Navajo term meaning "my little sister".

The trio began their careers as The Osborn Sisters, were signed to the Nashville division of RCA Records, and recorded an album that was never released. By 1999 the sisters renamed the group SHeDAISY and signed to Lyric Street Records. Their first album, The Whole SHeBANG, was issued that year and certified platinum in the United States. A Christmas album entitled Brand New Year was released in 2000, Knock on the Sky was issued in 2002, the gold-certified Sweet Right Here was released in 2004, Fortuneteller's Melody in 2006, and the compilation The Best of SHeDAISY in 2008.

SHeDAISY has charted 15 times on the Billboard Hot Country Songs charts. Their hits include "Little Good-Byes," "This Woman Needs", "I Will… But", "Don't Worry 'bout a Thing", and two Christmas singles.

History 
The Osborns began singing very young, performing for relatives in their hometown of Magna, Utah. They sold tickets to neighborhood shows, performed at local retirement homes, and sang "The Star-Spangled Banner" at Utah Jazz home games. After moving to Nashville, Tennessee, they worked similar shifts at different department stores and shared a car.

Kristyn, the group's songwriter, wrote or co-wrote every song on SHeDAISY's studio albums except for "God Bless The American Housewife." Early on, SHeDAISY worked with Jason Deere, an Oklahoma-native Mormon songwriter in Nashville. He produced them while they were signed to Lyric Street.

Middle sister Kelsi played "Alice Flinders" in the 1989 video version of the musical Saturday's Warrior.

Kassidy is the lead vocalist, Kelsi sings high harmony, and Kristyn handles low harmony.

Recording career

19891998 

The sisters first performed as The Osborn Sisters. In 1989, they were signed to RCA Records and recorded an album that was never released. Kristyn stated that the record's scrapping was a blessing in disguise: 

They spent over five years working in department stores and playing nightclubs. Kristyn attended classes at a local university to learn about the music business. Later, the sisters began performing under the name SHeDAISY, derived from a Navajo term meaning "my (little) sister".

19992001: The Whole SHeBANG 
SHeDAISY signed to Lyric Street Records in 1999. Their debut album, The Whole SHeBANG, produced by Dann Huff was released that year.  Its first three singles did well: 1999's "Little Good-Byes" reached number 3 and "This Woman Needs" reached number 9, and "I Will… But", released in 2000, reached number 2 on the Billboard Hot Country Singles & Tracks charts, topped only by "That's the Way" by Jo Dee Messina. The album's fourth single, "Lucky 4 You (Tonight I'm Just Me)" did not reach the Top Ten, while 2001's "Still Holding Out for You" peaked at number 27.
The Whole SHeBANG was certified platinum in the United States for sales of one million copies. The album spent 99 weeks on the Billboard Country Albums Chart. The band's debut album was remixed and re-released, entitled The Whole SHeBANG: All Mixed Up, released in late 2001, and debuted at number 30 on the Billboard Country Albums Chart.

SHeDAISY appeared on the Disney Channel television program So Weird in 1999 and the ABC Network program The Drew Carey Show in 2001. The group also were guests stars on Hollywood Squares during Sibling Week.

A CMT special featuring SHeDAISY performing many of the songs from The Whole SHeBANG in concert was broadcast on February 9, 2000.

They released a Christmas album titled Brand New Year in September 2000. This album's renditions of "Jingle Bells" and "Deck the Halls" entered the country music charts, with the latter single appearing in the end credits of Disney's 1999 direct-to-video film, Mickey's Once Upon a Christmas. In addition, they hosted a Christmas special titled A SHeVERY Merry Christmas, on The Nashville Network, now known as Spike TV.

20022003: Knock on the Sky 
Knock on the Sky was the title of SHeDAISY's second album, issued in 2002. Although the album debuted at number 3 on Billboard's country album chart, its singles did not fare as well as their debut album. Only two singles were issued from the album: "Get Over Yourself" and "Mine All Mine", which peaked at numbers 27 and 28 on the country singles charts, respectively. The latter song was featured on the soundtrack of the 2002 film Sweet Home Alabama and the video included clips from the movie. The album quickly declined in the sales charts. Despite the low sales numbers, SHeDAISY considered Knock on the Sky as their best and most artistic album.

On January 2, 2003, SHeDAISY sang "The Star-Spangled Banner" and "I Will...But" at the halftime show of the Orange Bowl.

20042005: Sweet Right Here 

SHeDAISY returned to the country music charts in 2004 with the single "Passenger Seat", the precursor to their third studio album Sweet Right Here. "Passenger Seat" reached number 12 on the Billboard country charts and the Top 10 on the Radio & Records country singles charts. Sweet Right Here was released on June 8, 2004, debuting at number 2 on the Billboard Top Country Albums charts. The album achieved a gold certification from the RIAA for sales of over 500,000 copies.

The album's second single, "Come Home Soon", was released in July 2004. A first-person ballad about a woman wishing for her husband to come back home from fighting war overseas, "Come Home Soon" also inspired sales of special "Come Home Soon" bracelets, the proceeds of which went to the American Red Cross. "Don't Worry 'Bout a Thing", the third single from Sweet Right Here, became SHeDAISY's first Top Ten hit in 5 years, as well as their most recent, peaking at number seven.

Country music artist LeAnn Rimes recorded a song co-written by Kristyn Osborn, titled "I Dare You", for her 2005 album This Woman. SHeDAISY included their version of the song on Sweet Right Here.

20062007: Fortuneteller's Melody 

Fortuneteller's Melody was SHeDAISY's fourth studio album, and sixth in total. Kristyn co-wrote songs with Sheryl Crow and the album's producer John Shanks. Released in 2006, it produced two minor hit singles on the country music charts: "I'm Taking the Wheel" and "In Terms of Love"; the latter was co-written by Don Schlitz. After a debut at number 6 on the Billboard Country Albums Chart, the album left the charts by the end of 2006.

SHeDAISY contributed the song "God Bless the American Housewife" to a special compilation entitled Music from and Inspired by Desperate Housewives. The song was never released as a single in the U.S., but was a Top 20 hit in Canada with the alternate title, "God Bless The Canadian Housewife". A music video was made for it. The song was included on Fortuneteller's Melody.

In 2007, Canadian singer/songwriter Jann Arden co-wrote and recorded a song with Kristyn entitled 'Counterfeit Heart' for her album, Uncover Me. Kristyn also lends background vocals to two tracks on Uncover Me.

Also in 2007, the trio recorded a cover version of Bonnie Raitt's "Something to Talk About" for the soundtrack of the film The Guardian. Country music singer Carmen Rasmusen recorded a song written by Kristyn entitled 'Stranded' for her debut album, Nothin' Like the Summer.

20082011: The Best of SHeDAISY and A Story to Tell 
SHeDAISY released their first greatest hits compilation, The Best of SHeDAISY, on February 5, 2008, which included the greatest hits from their first four studio albums, excluding the Christmas album.

In mid-2008, SHeDAISY and their song "23 Days", were featured in a television advertising campaign for the Sleep Number bed created by Select Comfort. The commercial was first broadcast on the night of March 20, 2008. In July 2008, SHeDAISY was featured on the Walt Disney Records compilation, Country Sings Disney singing "Baby Mine", a cover version of the song first featured in the Walt Disney movie Dumbo.

SHeDAISY recorded a fifth studio album, A Story to Tell, which was produced by Jann Arden. Previews of two new songs, "A 2 Me" and "Mr. McLennen", were once available on their now-defunct official website, shedaisy.com. The title of the album was derived from lyrics in "Mr. McLennen". On March 9, 2010, it was announced that SHeDAISY had left Lyric Street Records, leaving A Story to Tell unreleased.

In 2011, the group released a cover of "With a Little Luck" as part of the Linda McCartney tribute album Let Us in Nashville: A Tribute to Linda McCartney.  Despite the lack of new music from the trio, their Facebook page and Twitter feed have seen occasional updates into the early 2020s.

Family and personal lives 
They have another sister, Karli, and two brothers, Clayton and Cade. Karli took Kelsi's place for the Fortuneteller's Melody summer tour while she was pregnant with her twin girls, Savannah Marie and Adyson Amilia, whom she and her husband Steve Simpson welcomed in July 2006. Karli also took Kelsi's place in the video for "In Terms of Love".

All three sisters are members of the Church of Jesus Christ of Latter-day Saints.

Kassidy was previously involved in a two-year romance with Rascal Flatts guitarist and labelmate Joe Don Rooney. The couple parted in 2003 and she married Derek Williamson on May 28, 2009.

Kristyn was married to Joel Stevenett for four years until their divorce in 2002. Some of the songs from Knock on the Sky are about her divorce. Kristyn had a relationship with actor Aaron Eckhart during 2006 and 2007 and he appears in the SHeDAISY video for 'I'm  Taking The Wheel'.

Awards 
1999: CMT Video Awards: Rising Star – Won
1999: Billboard Music Video Awards: Best New Artist Clip for "Little Good-Byes" – Won
1999: Grammy Awards: Country Vocal Group for "Little Good-Byes" – Nominated
2000: Academy of Country Music: Top New Duo or Group – Nominated
2000: Country Music Association: Horizon Award – Nominated
2004: American Music Awards: Best Country Duo or Group – Nominated

Discography 

Studio albums
1999: The Whole SHeBANG
2000: Brand New Year
2002: Knock on the Sky
2004: Sweet Right Here
2006: Fortuneteller's Melody

References

External links 

American country music groups
Country pop groups
Latter Day Saints from Utah
Lyric Street Records artists
Musical groups from Utah
Sibling musical trios
Vocal trios
RCA Records Nashville artists
Musical groups established in 1989
Musical groups disestablished in 1991
Musical groups reestablished in 1999
Musical groups disestablished in 2011
1989 establishments in Utah